The RS02, brand name Brockenhexe (English: Brocken Witch), is a tractor made by VEB Schlepperwerk Nordhausen alongside the larger tractor RS01. In total, 1935 units of the Brockenhexe were produced from 1949 to 1952. It was available with and without a cab.

Technical description 

The Brockenhexe utilises a frameless block construction, a dead front beam axle and a rear live axle. Due to the lack of a small DDR-made diesel engine, the Deutz licensed  F2M 414 engine was used. The straight two-cylinder, four-stroke diesel engine with water-cooling and prechamer injection, produces 16,2 kW at 1500 min−1; the displacement is 2200 cm³. The engine has a decompression system and a hand crank for starting. The torque is transmitted to the gearbox with a clutch of the type Renak 16K. The gearbox was also built under licence. It is a ZF Friedrichshafen four-speed gearbox with a reverse gear. For braking, drum brakes are used, whereas the hand brake is a gearbox brake. For power take-off, the tractor has a belt-pulley and an engine speed dependent PTO. Some Brockenhexe units were equipped with a cab, some tractors also have a mower bar.

Technical data

Bibliography 
 Achim Bischof: Traktoren in der DDR - Podszun-Verlag, 2004, .

Tractors
IFA vehicles